Kosakowo  (formerly ) is a village in Puck County, Pomeranian Voivodeship, in northern Poland. It is the seat of the gmina (administrative district) called Gmina Kosakowo.

For details of the history of the region, see History of Pomerania.

The village has a population of around 1500. It is the site of a military airport (Gdynia-Kosakowo Airport), serving the city of Gdynia.

References

Kosakowo